Anilios zonula, also known as the West Kimberley blind snake, is a species of blind snake that is endemic to Australia. The specific epithet zonula (“little belt”) refers to the slender appearance of the species.

Description
The snake grows to about 19 cm in length. It is long and slender, purplish-pink to pale pink in colour. It lacks a tail-spine.

Distribution and habitat
The species occurs in the West Kimberley region of north-west Western Australia. It has only been recorded from Storr and Augustus Islands, where specimens were collected from beneath sandstone rocks. The type locality is Storr Island.

References

 
zonula
Snakes of Australia
Reptiles of Western Australia
Reptiles described in 2016
Taxa named by Ryan J. Ellis